The Inca Garcilaso de la Vega University (UIGV) is a private university located in the city of Lima, Peru. Founded on December 21, 1964, during the first government of President Fernando Belaúnde Terry. It is currently in the period of cessation of activities due to the fact that the Superintendencia Nacional de Educación Superior Universitaria (Sunedu) denied his licensing.

History 

The Inca Garcilaso de la Vega University was created in December 1964 by Supreme Decree No. 74 and 26-A. It took the name of the Inca Garcilaso de la Vega, a writer and historian of Hispanic-Inca descent considered the "first biological and spiritual mestizo of America".

Initially the university functioned as a pedagogical university, then having six faculties, but over the years it expanded its educational offer reaching a total of ten faculties that taught seventeen undergraduate degrees. In 1992, it began its undergraduate study program distance learning, and in 2010 it opened a graduate school that offered up to fifteen master's degrees and seven doctoral programs.

Currently, the university has thirteen faculties and one graduate school. In total, it offers 48 undergraduate degrees, 38 master's degrees, and 11 doctorates, in addition to 24 second-specialty programs.

On October 10, 2019, the Superintendencia Nacional de Educación Superior Universitaria (Sunedu) denied his licensing due to non-compliance with various basic quality conditions. For this reason, the university must cease its activities within a period of two years, counted from the following academic semester.

In May 2020, Sunedu extended to five years (three additional) the deadline for the cessation of academic activities of all universities with a denied license, due to the COVID-19 pandemic. However, during this period said houses of study will not be able to carry out admission processes.

Organization

Campus 

The Inca Garcilaso de la Vega University had six campuses in the city of Lima, which ceased their activities due to the coronavirus pandemic (COVID-19) and because it is in the liquidation process.

Academic areas 

 School of Administrative Sciences
 Administrative Sciences

 School of Pharmaceutical and Biochemical Sciences
 Pharmaceutical and Biochemical Sciences

 School of Foreign Trade and International Relations
 Port and Customs Management
 International Logistics
 International Relations and Negotiations

 School of Law and Political Science
 Law

 School of Nursing
 Nursing

 School of Stomatology
 Stomatology

 School of Administrative and Industrial Engineering
 Engineering management
 Industrial engineering

 School of Psychology and Social Work
 Psychology
 Social Work

 School of Medical technology
 Physical therapy and Rehabilitation

Notable alumni 
 Luis Alva Castro, (economist, former Vice President, former Prime Minister)
 Valia Barak (journalist and TV presenter)
 María Teresa Cabrera (lawyer, former Congresswoman)
 Omar Chehade (lawyer, Congressman)
 Arlette Contreras (lawyer, activist, Congresswoman, included in the TIME 100 list of the most influential people)
 José Lecaros (lawyer, President of the Supreme Court)
 Ana Rosa Liendo (actress, storyteller and radio host)
 Agustín Mantilla† (economist, sociologist, former Congressman and Minister of the Interior)
 Daniel Maurate (lawyer, former Minister of Labor and Employment Promotion)
 Carlos Morán (lawyer, General in retreat of the National Police of Peru, former Minister of the Interior)
 Álvaro Ugaz† (journalist and TV presenter)
 Vicente Zeballos (lawyer, former President of the Council of Ministers)
 César Zumaeta (economist, former Congressman and President of the Congress)

See also
 Education in Peru
 List of universities in Peru

References

External links

 Official Web site

Universities in Peru